"Hold Me While You Wait" is a song by Scottish singer-songwriter Lewis Capaldi, released as a single from his debut studio album Divinely Uninspired to a Hellish Extent on 3 May 2019. It was released alongside the album pre-order. It debuted at number one on the Irish Singles Chart, number one on the Scottish Singles Chart, and number four on the UK Singles Chart. In Scotland, Capaldi held both the number 1 and number 2 in the official chart, and in the UK, he became the first artist since Ed Sheeran to have 2 songs in the top 5 of the singles chart. The song went on to spend a total of 34 weeks on the UK Singles Chart.

Background
Capaldi said he wrote the song "about the uncertainty of being in a relationship when your partner isn't sure what they want", which he explained as "one of the most desperate places you can find yourself in" due to the "impending hopelessness" of the situation. Capaldi told Music Week that he is not concerned about the commercial performance of the song, as "if it doesn't go on to do what Someone You Loved has done, that's OK as far as I'm concerned because this was never meant to happen in the f**king first place. Don't ask for too much, let's not get greedy."

Critical reception
Idolator called the song "another emotional sucker punch that painstakingly depicts the end of a relationship" like "Someone You Loved", also describing the chorus as "wonderfully depressing".

Track listing

Charts

Weekly charts

Year-end charts

Certifications

References

2019 singles
2019 songs
Irish Singles Chart number-one singles
Lewis Capaldi songs
Songs written by Jamie Hartman
Songs written by Lewis Capaldi
Songs written by Jamie N Commons
Song recordings produced by TMS (production team)
Universal Music Group singles
Vertigo Records singles